Bagor may refer to:
Bagor, alternative form of the Russian male first name Abagor
Bagor District (kecamatan), a district of Nganjuk Regency of East Java, Indonesia
Bagor Barangay, a barangay of Kadingilan in Bukidnon Province, Philippines
Bagor, Rajasthan, a village in India
Bagor Station, a railway station in Indonesia